Birayma Dyeme-Kumba (ruled c.1527–c.1543) was the eleventh ruler, or Burba, of the Jolof Empire.

References

16th-century monarchs in Africa
Year of birth missing
1543 deaths